João Guedes Branco (b. 1 July 1968) is a French-born Portuguese theatrical actor and reviewer, professor, and programmer. He had a theatrical career for over 30 years and appeared in more than 50 plays, most of them in Mindelo, Cape Verde. 

Branco was the founder of the Portuguese Cultural Centre's Theatrical Group and started a new era in theater on the island of São Vicente. He took part in the Mindelo International Film Festival, which is a major event in lusophony African theatre. Branco was a founder of Academia Livre de Artes Integradas do Mindelo, Free Academy of Integrated Arts of Mindelo (ALAIM), which was recognized by many of his fellow actors. By introducing a new model in artistic education on the island of São Vicente, he became an indispensable reference to theater in Cape Verde.

Early life
João Branco was born in Paris, France to Portuguese musician José Mario Branco and programmer Isabel Alves Costa.

He specialized in arts, communication, and culture at the University of Algarve. At the university, he took a maximum rank of Very Good, Praised and Distinction. For his masters in scientific arts, he acquired the rank of Very Good. He obtained a license in the Protection of Heritage and cultural organization with a rank of Very Good.

He started his artistic activities in 1984 with the playwright João Paulo Seara Cardoso. In 1987, he was invited by the Students' Association to perform in a stage play with Liceu Camões. In 1990, he performed his first play Quem me dera ser onda, written by Angolan Mário Rui at D. Maria II Secondary School in Lisbon.

Career

Cape Verde
He moved to Mindelo on the island of São Vicente, Cape Verde in 1991.

From 1993, he began his theatrical course and was invited to the Portuguese Cultural Centre (CCP - Centro Cultural Português) and appeared in fourteen productions.

He founded the CCP Theatrical Group of Mindelo in 1993 and became its playwright and artistic director.  The group has made over fifty theatrical productions performing the works of Cape Verdean authors such as Arménio Vieira, Germano Almeida, Caplan Neves, and Mário Lúcio Soura, as well as the works of Camus, Oscar Wilde, Garcia Lorca, William Shakespeare, Victor Hugo, Molière, Beckett, Muller and Alfonso Castelão. 

He was invited in 1994 to manage all of the Camões Institute Artistic activities at the Portuguese Cultural Center and Mindelo (Porto Grande) Polo. In 2003, he became director of the same cultural center. He was one of the founders of the Mindelo International Theatrical Festival in 1995, which became one of the most important events for African theater. From 1996 to 2013, he was the first president of Mindelact, another theatrical organization in Cape Verde. 

Branco is the author of an edited work on Cape Verdean theater called, Theatre Nation - History of Theatre in Cape Verde, published in 2004 by the National Library of Cape Verde. This book was recognized by the Capeverdean Association of Writers for pioneering investigative literature in Cape Verde.  Since 2013, he has been at the Academy of Letters of Cape Verde.  He was also the author of the Capeverdean book “O teatro dos Sete Povos Lusófonos (The Book of Seven Lusophony Peoples), written with the São Paulo Cultural Center in Brazil. In 2003, he edited the book 10 Years in Theater (10 anos de teatro), referencing the history of the GTCCPM.  He founded a review in 1997 titled "Mindelact - Theatre in Review.".  He published several articles in journals such as A Nação, Horizonte and Cidadão and contributed in newspapers such as A Semana and the Portuguese Expresso.

Recognition 
He received the Theatrical Merit Award in 2010 as well as the Lusophony Theatrical Merit Award, given by the Luso-Brazilian Foundation on the development of the Portuguese language in Recife in 1996. In 1999, he received the Micadinaia Cultural Prize for the Comparative Academic Studies of S. Vicente.  He was decorated in 2010 by the president of the Republic of Cape Verde with First Class of the Order of Vulcan medal for his contribution to the Cape Verdean culture as well as in general scientific arts. In June 2014, he received the Sabino Évora Award of Excellence at the SalEncena International Festival in the island of Sal.

Personal life
He married and had three daughters, Laura Gonçalves Branco, Inês Gonçalves Branco and Isabel Costa Branco.

Works

Playwright 

1991: Quem me dera ser Onda, novel by Mário Rui - performed with GTCCPM
1993: Fome de 47 - unknown author - performed with GTCCPM
1993: A Estátua e Etc. - collective text - performed with GTCPPM
1994: Our Fisherman (Nos Pescadores) - collective text - performed with GTCCPM
1994: Chico - collective text - performed with GTCCPM
1995: Gin Tonic Surrealist - partly by Mário Henrique Leiria - performed with GTCCPM
1996: Adaptation of a book by Oscar Wilde - performed with GTCCPM
1997: Bad Love a play by himself - performed with GTCCPM - performed with GTCCPM
1997 and 2007: A play, an adaptation of a book by Garcia Lorca - performed with GTCCPM
1998: Romeo and Juliet by William Shakespeare - performed with GTCCPM
1999: Os dois irmãos, adaptation of a novel by Germano Almeida - performed with GTCCPM
1999: Figa Canhota, collective text - performed with GTCCPM
1999: Catchupa, collective text - performed with GTCCPM
2000: Agravos de um Artista, adaptation of a short story by Germano Almeida - performed with GTCCPM
2001: Count of Abranhos, adaption of a book by Eça de Queirós - performed with GTCCPM
2001; Adão e as Sete Pretas de Fuligem, by Mário Lúcio Sousa, within the scope of the Porto 2011 Cultural Capital of Europe, performed in Porto and in Lisbon
2002: Salon by Mário Lúcio Sousa
2003: King Lear by William Shakespeare, co-produced with Atelier Teatrakácia
2004: Tertúlia, based on the poems
2005: High Seas - a poem by Mrozek and Eugénio Tavares
2006: "Women of Lajinha" ("Mulheres na Lajinha"), a part of the novel O mar na Lajinha by Germano Almeida
2007: A Caderneta, by Baltasar Lopes da Silva
2009: The Fire (No Inferno), based on a book by Arménio Vieira
2009: O Jardim do Dr. Gordner Brickers, by Caplan Neves
2011: Closer by Patrick Marber, Projecto Aquarium, Lisbon, Portugal
2012: Stand Up Comedy Pará Moss, collective texts with Trupe Pará (Pará Troop)
2012: Theory of Silence (Teorema do Silêncio) by Caplan Neves
2012: As Mindelenses (The Mindelians, sometimes as Gramportians) - collective texts with Trupe Pará (Pará Troop)
2013: Neverland - book adaptation of Peter Pan by J.M. Barrie with Project KCena in Salvador de Bahìa, Brazil
2013: Sete Pequenas Peça, Para Sete Grandes Crises - collective text with Trupe Pará (Pará Troop)
2013: The Tempest by William Shakespeare
2014: The Lesson, by Eugène Ionesco with Trupe Pará (Pará Troop)
2015: Do-Eu with the Free University of Vila Velha Theater in Salvador de Bahía, Brazil
2015: Morabesta, with Teatro 15 Project - Mindelo
2016 - Strangers by José Luis Peixoto, co-produced with Teatro Rivoli in Porto, Portugal

Assistant playwright
1999 - Cloun Creolus Dei - a play by Miguel Seabra
2013 - Cloun City - a play by Janaína Alves with the troop Para Moss in Cape Verde

As an actorFome de 47 (1993)A Estátua e Etc. (1993)Gin Tonic Surrealist (1995)
 Romeo and Juliet (1998)Cloun Creolus Dei (1999-2008)Count of Abranhos (2001)Adão e as Sete Pretas de Fuligem (2002)Alice (2012)Theory of Silence (2013)The Tempest'' (2013)

References

External links
Official website
Café Margoso blog 

1968 births
Living people
Male actors from Paris
Portuguese expatriates in Cape Verde
Portuguese male actors